Itimous Thaddeus "Tim" Valentine Jr. (March 15, 1926 – November 10, 2015) was a Democratic member of the United States House of Representatives from North Carolina from 1983 to 1995.

Early life
Valentine was born on March 15, 1926, in Rocky Mount, North Carolina, and attended public schools. His father, also named Itimous and known by that name (he was one of several brothers with unusual names of unknown origin), was a State Supreme Court justice. His mother, the former Hazel Armstrong, was a postmistress. His uncle was United States Air Force Lieutenant General Frank A. Armstrong.

During World War II he joined the U.S. Army Air Corps and served on active duty from 1944 to 1946.

He graduated from The Citadel in Charleston, South Carolina, in 1948, and graduated from the law school of the University of North Carolina at Chapel Hill in 1952, being admitted to the North Carolina bar that same year. He practiced law with a firm bearing his family name in Nashville.

Political career
Valentine served in the North Carolina House of Representatives from 1955 to 1960. Thereafter, he was an advisor and counsel to Governor Dan K. Moore and later chaired the executive committee of the North Carolina Democratic Party (1966–1968). He was a delegate to the 1968 Democratic National Convention. In 1982 he was elected to Congress from North Carolina's 2nd congressional district and served six terms in the House of Representatives. He did not stand for re-election in 1994 and retired from elected office when his term expired in January 1995. A portion of U.S. 64 near Nashville is named for him in recognition of his public service.

Personal life
Valentine was survived by Barbara Reynolds, four children from his first marriage to Betsy, including talk radio host Phil Valentine; three stepchildren; nine grandchildren; five step-grandchildren; and a step-great-grandson.

Valentine died at his home in Nashville on November 10, 2015, from heart failure at the age of 89. His death came one week after the death of a Republican former colleague, Howard Coble of North Carolina's 6th congressional district.

References

External links
 Retrieved on 2008-0
U.S. Congress Biographical Directory entry
NC Spin profile
 

1926 births
2015 deaths
People from Nashville, North Carolina
People from Rocky Mount, North Carolina
The Citadel, The Military College of South Carolina alumni
University of North Carolina School of Law alumni
Democratic Party members of the North Carolina House of Representatives
North Carolina Democratic Party chairs
North Carolina lawyers
Democratic Party members of the United States House of Representatives from North Carolina
United States Army Air Forces personnel of World War II
20th-century American politicians
20th-century American lawyers